Matti Santeri Ruohola (12 June 1940 – 16 February 2014) was a Finnish actor and comedian.

Ruohola began acting as early as 1965 and has made several appearances in mostly film but Finnish television also always in comedy. He has appeared in films such as in the 1983 James Bond spoof Agent 000 and the Deadly Curves opposite actors Ilmari Saarelainen and Tenho Saurén but more recently since 1990 has provided the Moominpappa's and Stinky's voice for Finnish cartoons such as Moomin.

Selected filmography 
 The Diary of a Worker (1967)
 Antti the Treebranch (1976)

References

External links 

1940 births
2014 deaths
People from Heinola
Finnish male television actors
Finnish male voice actors
20th-century Finnish male actors
21st-century Finnish male actors
Finnish male film actors